Blind Trail (also The Blind Trail) is a 1926 American silent Western film directed by Leo D. Maloney and starring Maloney, Josephine Hill and Nelson McDowell.

Cast
 Leo D. Maloney as Bob Carson 
 Josephine Hill as Alice Bartlett
 Nelson McDowell as Hank O'Hara
 Bud Osborne as Mort Van Vlack
 Jim Corey as Al Leitz 
 Al Hart as William Skinner
 Whitehorse as The Sheriff 
 Eva Thatcher as The Cook

References

Bibliography
 Connelly, Robert B. The Silents: Silent Feature Films, 1910-36, Volume 40, Issue 2. December Press, 1998.
 Munden, Kenneth White. The American Film Institute Catalog of Motion Pictures Produced in the United States, Part 1. University of California Press, 1997.

External links
 

1926 films
1926 Western (genre) films
American silent feature films
American Western (genre) films
Films directed by Leo D. Maloney
American black-and-white films
1920s English-language films
1920s American films